Daphnella gracillima is an extinct species of sea snail, a marine gastropod mollusk in the family Raphitomidae.

Description
The length of the shell attains 21 mm.

Distribution
Fossils of this marine species were found in Miocene strata Tasmania, Australia.

References

 Tenison Woods J.E., 1877. Notes on the fossils referred to in the foregoing paper (i.e. by R. M. Johnston) Ibid, for 1876: 91–116.

External links
 Darragh, Thomas A. "Catalogue of Australian Tertiary Mollusca (except chitons)." Memoirs of the National Museum of Victoria 31 (1970): 125-212.

gracillima
Gastropods described in 1877